Whitney Souness (born 1995) is a New Zealand netball player. , she was playing for Central Pulse and had played 14 times for the New Zealand national netball team.

Early life
Souness was born on 12 October or 12 November 1995 (sources vary). She comes from Porirua in the Wellington Region of the North Island of New Zealand. She attended St Mary's College in Wellington and, on the school's netball team, was coached by the former Samoan international, Frances Solia. She was chosen for the New Zealand Secondary Schools side in 2013, and was in the national development squad in 2014 and 2015.

Netball career
Souness joined Central Pulse. In 2015 she suffered an ACL injury while playing for Wellington in the final of the national provincial championships. As a result, she was unable to compete for much of 2016. She played for  Central Pulse from 2017 to 2019, before spending a year with the Waikato Bay of Plenty Magic. She returned to Central Pulse in 2021, swapping to an attacking role, having in the past mainly played in the centre court.

Souness was given a trial for with New Zealand, in 2015, but then suffered her ACL injury. She was finally selected for the team in 2017, playing her first match, against South Africa, in August of that year, and being the 167th woman to play for the national team. By the end of 2021 she had played 14 games, in the wing attack (WA) and centre (C) positions. When not playing netball, Souness works as a personal trainer.

References

1995 births
Living people
New Zealand netball players
New Zealand international netball players
Netball players from Porirua
Central Pulse players
Waikato Bay of Plenty Magic players
ANZ Premiership players
Commonwealth Games bronze medallists for New Zealand
Commonwealth Games medallists in netball
Netball players at the 2022 Commonwealth Games
New Zealand international Fast5 players
Medallists at the 2022 Commonwealth Games